Gonzalo Gabriel Choy González (born November 11, 1981) is a Uruguayan football midfielder or striker who plays for Cúcuta Deportivo in the Categoría Primera A.

Career
Choy began his career at C.A. Cerro in Montevideo, but soon made his way to Argentina. His first club in Argentina was Gimnasia y Esgrima La Plata. He stayed with Gimnasia for four years, then had short spells with Olimpo and Quilmes, before joining Argentinos Juniors in 2006.

On the 18th round of the 2006 Apertura tournament, Choy scored an equalizer against Estudiantes de La Plata. In the next match his former club, Gimnasia, presented him with a plaque, as they were certain that his goal would deny Estudiantes a chance of winning the championship. However, Boca Juniors lost two straight games and Estudiantes then won a playoff match to take the championship. Choy's effort proved fruitless. In January 2010 Tigre signed the former Rosario Central midfielder on a free transfer. His period at Tigre was short-lived as he joined Arsenal de Sarandí in July 2010.

References

External links
 
 
 Argentine Primera statistics  

1981 births
Living people
Uruguayan footballers
Uruguayan expatriate footballers
Association football midfielders
Footballers from Montevideo
C.A. Cerro players
Club de Gimnasia y Esgrima La Plata footballers
Olimpo footballers
Quilmes Atlético Club footballers
Argentinos Juniors footballers
Rosario Central footballers
Club Atlético Tigre footballers
C.F. Monterrey players
Atlético Morelia players
Arsenal de Sarandí footballers
Argentine Primera División players
Liga MX players
Expatriate footballers in Argentina
Expatriate footballers in Mexico